USS Victorious is a name used more than once by the U.S. Navy:

 USS Victorious (ID-3514), a steel-hulled, single-screw cargo vessel commissioned at San Francisco, California, on 19 October 1918.
 , an ocean surveillance ship delivered to the Navy, 13 August 1991.

See also
 Victorious (disambiguation)

References 

United States Navy ship names